Nicholas Raymond Elliott (born 1955, in Peterborough) is a British photographer.

Biography
Elliott grew up in Stanground and joined Ascential when it was East Midlands Allied Press (EMAP), and worked as an editorial photographer for Anglian Times, Motor Cycle News and Motor Cycle Racing.

After Elliott left EMAP he was commissioned by IPC for Truck Magazine, Car Magazine, and Auto Car. Elliott also worked with agencies Saatchi & Saatchi, Yellow Hammer, Carlson, Young & Rubican, GGT, Ogilvy & Mather, and MSBK.

In 1990, Publicis' campaign If You're Not Feeling Too Special for Sonatogen placed 3rd in Euro Best Awards using Elliott’s photography. Elliott was commissioned by TBWA to photograph the 1992 UK general election billboard for the Liberal Democrats.

Elliott has photographed musicians throughout his career, shot in Nashville, Tennessee, in 2010 and for Planet Rock.

Published work 
Elliott's images have been used by record companies and musicians, and his work has been exhibited.

In 2011, Rufus Stone released a book; TEN-A Decade In Images, using Elliott’s images from the Cambridge Folk Festival, endorsed by the festival organisers Cambridge City Council. Elliott published a follow-up; 50Folk, as a personal celebration of 50 years of the festival, in 2014. 

A year later, Elliott released Three Weeks One Summer documenting The Marmalade during the making of Penultimate. A fourth book, Ice Cream & Sun Cream, was released in 2017.

Media 
Elliott had a cameo in music videos by Gary Curtis: "Crazy Love"; "If Every Day Was Like Christmas"; "Why"; and "All Alone At Christmas"; and short film The Guardian, by Aturn Films, in 2015.

Elliott’s music choice was the subject of a seven-episode special, Tracks of Nick's Years, on community radio Endeavour FM in 2014. The following year, Elliott co-hosted Sound And Nick's Vision on university radio Siren FM.

In 2021, Elliott began travelling around Norfolk in a motorhome, Penthouse One, with Andy Blithe.

Personal life 
Elliott has been divorced twice and lives in Norfolk, England.

References

External links 

Photographers from Cambridgeshire
Living people
1955 births
People from Peterborough